Shahrak-e Zayandeh Rud (also Romanized as Shahrak-e Zāyandeh Rūd; also known as Fenārat) is a village in Jey Rural District, in the Central District of Isfahan County, Isfahan Province, Iran. At the 2006 census, its population was 957, in 261 families.

References 

Populated places in Isfahan County